Bolam is a small village located in County Durham, England. The village population (including Hilton and Morton Tinmouth) at the 2011 census was 209. It is situated a few miles to the north-west of Darlington.

In 2009 Npower Renewables identified an area of land to the north-west of Bolam as a possible site for the location of seven wind turbines, each up to 125 metres tall.

References

External links

Villages in County Durham